Dosti is a 1964 Indian Hindi-language drama film directed by Satyen Bose, produced by Tarachand Barjatya, and distributed by Rajshri Productions. The film focuses on the friendship between two boys: one blind and the other physically disabled. The film features Sudhir Kumar Sawant and Sushil Kumar Somaya, and also starred Indian actor Sanjay Khan.

Dosti was amongst the top ten highest grossing films of 1964, declared a "Super Hit" at the box office, and entered into the 4th Moscow International Film Festival. In 1977, the film was remade in Malayalam (and Telugu) as Sneham. Dosti won six Filmfare Awards out of seven nominated categories.

Plot
Ramnath "Ramu" Gupta’s (Somaya) father, a factory worker, dies in an accident. When the factory refuses to pay compensation that is due, his mother faints due to shock and falls down the stairs. Ramu is also injured in an accident and becomes crippled.

After being thrown out of his home, crippled, and penniless, he roams around the streets of Mumbai. He meets Mohan (Sawant), a blind boy who has a similar background: Mohan has a sister, Meena, who left for Mumbai to find work as a nurse to pay for her brother’s treatment. Mohan eventually left the village after his caretaker died.

Ramu is good at playing the harmonica while Mohan is good at singing. They collaborate and sing songs on the road to earn money from pedestrians. Ramu wants to finish his studies, and they both befriend a small girl, Manjula (Baby Farida), who is the sister of a rich man, Ashok (Sanjay Khan). Manjula suffers from rheumatic heart disease and both the boys hope she would help them out.

Ramu and Mohan visit Manjula and ask for a loan of sixty rupees, the amount exactly required for Ramu's admission in school. Manjula's brother rebuffs them and gives them only five rupees. Feeling insulted, Mohan successfully raises the money by singing. Ramu is admitted to the school after performing very well on the entrance test. They move to a new house in a slum after someone tries to steal their hard-earned money while they slept on the footpath. Their new neighbor is Mausi, who lives with her teenage daughter and son, and treats Ramu and Mohan as her own sons.

In school, Ramu excels in studies despite being a regular target of ridicule by richer students who do not consider him their equal and often degrade him for being a "street beggar". The headmaster and teacher  look after Ramu before the teacher Sharma Ji declares himself as Ramu's guardian. During a visit to Ramu's house, Sharma Ji notices that the neighborhood is unfit for his studies and suggests that Ramu move in with him, but Ramu does not want to leave Mohan. One day, while singing, Mohan hears Ashok calling out to Meena and rushes to embrace his long lost sister, but she is ashamed that Mohan has become a beggar and refuses to recognize him. Meena is looking after Manjula and there is a budding romance between her and Ashok. Meena confesses to him, and he consoles her that she would be with her brother soon.

Mohan senses Manjula while sleeping and tells Ramu about it. Both decide to go and meet her, but she dies. Ashok brings Mohan home one day and gives him Manjula's chime as her remembrance. When he tries to tell Mohan about Meena, Mohan lashes out in rage and says that he considers himself to be alone in the world, save for his friend Ramu.

Soon after, Ramu gets in trouble with some ruffians and is mistakenly arrested by police during a burglary. Sharma Ji goes to the police station and bails out Ramu, on the condition that he will live with Sharma Ji and cut off contact with Mohan. Mohan is heartbroken and decides to visit him. But Sharma Ji doesn't allow him to talk to Mohan. Sad, Mohan roams the streets singing sad songs.

Sharma Ji suddenly dies, leaving Ramu devastated. Ramu decides not to take the final exam as he is unable to pay the fees. Mohan hears about it and decides to raise the money by singing in the streets in spite of his ill health. He successfully earns the money and pays the fees without Ramu's knowledge before falling ill and being admitted to the hospital. Without telling him, Meena cares for Mohan as he recuperates.

Ramu places first in the exams and learns of Mohan's sacrifice. He rushes to Mohan in the hospital to ask for forgiveness where Mohan says that he was never angry with him. The doctor tells Mohan about Meena and he forgives her. The movie ends with all of them in a loving embrace.

Cast
 Sushil Kumar Somaya as Ramnath "Ramu" Gupta
 Sudhir Kumar Sawant as Mohan
 Baby Farida as Manjula "Manju"
 Sanjay Khan Ashok
 Leela Mishra as Mausi
 Leela Chitnis as Ramu's mother, Mrs Gupta
 Abhi Bhattacharya as Headmaster
 Uma Rajoo as Nurse Meena (Mohan's sister)
 Nana Palsikar as School Teacher Sharma Ji
 Moolchand as Ashok's employee

Soundtrack
The lyrics of the film were written by Majrooh Sultanpuri and composed by Laxmikant Pyarelal. Music director R. D. Burman played the harmonica on film scores and soundtracks. Dosti is a notable point in the musical duo's career as it won them their first Filmfare Award and made them popular in the film industry. Mohammed Rafi is the main vocalist for the songs.

Box office
Dosti grossed Rs. 2 crores in the Indian box office and is the third highest-grossing film of 1964.

Awards 
The film won six awards from the seven nominations that it received. Dosti won the most awards of any film at that ceremony.

Won
 Best Film - Tarachand Barjatya
 Best Music Director - Laxmikant Pyarelal
 Best Story - Ban Bhatt
 Best Dialogue - Govind Moonis
 Best Playback Singer - Mohammad Rafi for the song "Chahoonga Main Tujhe Saanj Savere"
 Best Lyricist - Majrooh Sultanpuri for the song "Chahoonga Main Tujhe Saanj Savere"

Nominated
 Best Director - Satyen Bose

References

External links
 
 Review Essay in Visual Anthropology: Virtue Ethics of Boot Polish and Dosti, as Compared with Slumdog Millionaire

1964 films
1960s Hindi-language films
Best Hindi Feature Film National Film Award winners
Films about poverty in India
Films directed by Satyen Bose
Films scored by Laxmikant–Pyarelal
Hindi films remade in other languages
Rajshri Productions films